The National Tropical Botanical Garden (NTBG) is a Hawaii-based not-for-profit institution dedicated to tropical plant research, conservation, and education. It operates a network of botanical gardens and preserves in Hawaii and Florida.

History
In the early 1960s a group approached the U.S. Congress to charter a tropical botanical garden on U.S. soil. In 1964, Public Law 88-449 was enacted which chartered the Pacific Tropical Botanical Garden (which would later be changed to National Tropical Botanical Garden). 
The group is a not-for-profit non-governmental institution holding a congressional charter under Title 36 of the United States Code. The mission of the NTBG is to enrich life through discovery, scientific research, conservation, and education by perpetuating the survival of plants, ecosystems, and cultural knowledge of tropical regions. This mission would be achieved through: a network of diverse gardens and preserves in Hawai`i and Florida, each with significant biological, cultural, and historical resources; conservation, research, and reference collections (living, library, and herbarium) assembled through discovery and collaboration; research in botany, ethnobotany, horticulture, conservation biology, and restoration ecology through programs and institutes; educational courses, publications, lectures, and visitor programs; and facilities and infrastructure to conduct this work.

In 2019, they rediscovered a plant species previously deemed to be extinct, that is Hibiscadelphus woodii.

Sites

NTBG is headquartered in Kalāheo, on the island of Kauai in the state of Hawaii. The building was originally designed by architect Vladimir Ossipoff.
The Juliet Rice Wichman Botanical Research Center building, named after the conservationist and botanist, was constructed in 2003 under Dean Sakamoto of concrete to survive hurricanes. Hurricane Iniki devastated the area in 1992.

Garden sites are:
 McBryde Garden - Kauai island, Hawaii
 Allerton Garden - Kauai island, Hawaii
 Limahuli Garden and Preserve - Kauai island, Hawaii
 Kahanu Garden - Maui island, Hawaii
 The Kampong - Biscayne Bay, Coconut Grove, Florida

Thousands of species have been gathered from throughout the tropical world, through hundreds of field expeditions by staff and through collaborations with other institutions and researchers. Its living collections include the largest assemblages of native Hawaiian plant species and of breadfruit cultivars in existence. Tours of each of the gardens are available.

Preserves are also an important component of the NTBG. The preserves are seen as a refuge for nature, providing habitat for native and tropical plant species to mature and reproduce in a natural setting without the influence of human activity. They have also provided scientists the necessary means for the reintroduction of critically endangered species that are no longer found in the wild. These preserves act as large laboratories for experiments in conservation biology. The NTBG currently possesses and manages five preserves: the Lawai Preserve (adjacent to McBryde Garden on Kauai), the Ka'upulehu Preserve, which was acquired in the early 1970s on the island of Hawai'i; the Awini Preserve, which was acquired in 1975 on the island of Hawai'i; the Kahanu Preserve (adjacent to Kahanu Garden on Maui) and the Limahuli Preserve, which was acquired in 1994 on the island of Kaua'i.
At present, preserves are not open to the public.

Breadfruit Institute
The Breadfruit Institute was created by the National Tropical Botanical Garden in 2002 to increase focus on the preservation of breadfruit germplasm and promoting the fruit as a highly nutritional answer to global food shortages.

The mission of the Breadfruit Institute is to promote the conservation and use of breadfruit for food and reforestation. The institute is taking a leading role in the conservation of breadfruit diversity and ethnobotanical research documenting traditional uses and cultural practices involving breadfruit.

See also 
 List of botanical gardens in the United States

References

External links 

 National Tropical Botanical Garden

Botanical gardens in Florida
Botanical gardens in Hawaii
Research institutes in Hawaii
Protected areas of Kauai
Patriotic and national organizations chartered by the United States Congress
Protected areas established in 1964
1964 establishments in Hawaii
Environmental organizations established in 1964